This is list of archives in South Africa.

Archives in South Africa 

 National Archives of South Africa
 National Film, Video and Sound Archives (South Africa)
 Transvaal Central Archives

See also 

 List of archives
 List of museums in South Africa
 Culture of South Africa

External links 
  (video)

 
Archives
South Africa
Archives